The Western Ring Route is a motorway system being constructed in Auckland, New Zealand. It currently runs along (from south to north) the entire Southwestern Motorway (State Highway 20), most of the Northwestern Motorway (part of SH 16), the entire Upper Harbour Motorway, and the entire Upper Harbour Highway (the last two forming SH 18). When the Upper Harbour Highway is upgraded to motorway status, the route will surpass the Southern Motorway to become the longest motorway in New Zealand at 48 kilometres in length. It runs through Manukau, West Auckland, and the North Shore, bypassing the Auckland city centre and thus providing a second motorway route through the Auckland isthmus.

History 
The ring route had been planned as early as the first half of the 20th century. Some critics have alleged that the rerouting of State Highway 1 over the Auckland Harbour Bridge (to ensure toll revenues) was a primary contributor to the decades-long delays. The rerouting is alleged to have significantly contributed to the need for a massive motorway through the centre of Auckland, severely damaging inner city suburbs such as Freemans Bay and Grafton.

The section of SH 20 from Queenstown Road to Richardson Road (the Mount Roskill Extension) opened on 15 May 2009. The section of SH 18 connecting the Greenhithe Bridge and SH 16 (the Upper Harbour Motorway) and the extension of SH 16 to Brigham Creek Road opened in August 2011.

Construction of the Waterview Connection began in late 2011 and it was opened to traffic on 2 July 2017. This completed the route as a highway, with a remaining section of SH 18 still to be upgraded to motorway standard. The opening of the Waterview Connection allows traffic to travel along the entire length of the highway, from SH 1 near Rosedale to SH 1 at Manukau.

The Upper Harbour Highway section will be upgraded to motorway status as part of the Northern Corridor Improvements project, with construction starting in April 2018 and expected to be completed by September 2023.

Major junctions
{| class="wikitable"
|-
! Location
! km
! #
! Destinations
! Notes
|-
| rowspan=2| 
| rowspan=2| 0.0
| rowspan=2|
|  SH 1 Northern Motorway (south) – Auckland
| rowspan=2| Western Ring Route begins
|-
|  SH 1 Northern Motorway (north) – Whangarei
|-
| || || || Caribbean Drive ||
|-
| 
| || || Paul Matthews Drive ||
|-
|
| || || Unsworth Drive || Southbound exit only
|-
|
 || 2.4 || 2 || Route 26 Albany Highway || Motorway begins
|-
| rowspan=3| Greenhithe
| 4.3 || 4 || Greenhithe Road || Southbound exit and northbound entrance
|-
| 6.2 || 6 || Tauhinu Road || Northbound exit and southbound entrance
|-
| 7.4 || colspan=3| Upper Harbour Bridge over Waitematā Harbour
|-
| rowspan=3| Hobsonville || || 8 || Squadron Drive || Southbound exit and northbound entrance
|-
|-
| || 10 || Trig Road || Southbound exit and northbound entrance
|-
| rowspan=3| Westgate || || 11 || Route 32 Hobsonville Road || Southbound exit and northbound entrance
|-
| || ||  SH 16 Northwest Motorway (north) – Kumeu, Helensville
| 
|- 
| 19.4
|
| Route 32 Hobsonville Road 
| Northbound exit and southbound entrance
|-
| Massey East
| 17.8
| 18
| Royal Road
| Northbound exit and southbound entrance
|-
| Lincoln North
| 15.6
| 16
| Route 19 Lincoln Road – Henderson
| 
|-
| Te Atatū South
| 13.5
| 14
| Route 13 Te Atatu Road – Henderson
| 
|-
| rowspan=2| Avondale North
| 12.3
| 12
| Patiki Road – Avondale, New Lynn
| Southbound exit and northbound entrance
|-
| 10.8
| 11
| Rosebank Road
| Westbound exit and eastbound entrance
|-
| rowspan=4| Point Chevalier
| 8.2
| 8B
|  SH 20 Southwest Motorway (south)
| Beginning of Waterview Connection
|-
| 8.1
| 8A
| Route 11 Great North Road  – Avondale, New Lynn
| Southbound exit and northbound entrance
|-
|
|
|  SH 16 Northwest Motorway (east) – Auckland City Centre, Port
|
|-
| rowspan-2|
| rowspan=2 colspan=3| Waterview Tunnel
|-
| rowspan=3| Mount Roskill
|-
|
|
| Maioro Street
|
|-
|
| 18
| Route 4 Dominion Road
|
|-
| rowspan=2| Hillsborough
|
| 16
| Route 15 Hillsborough Road
|
|-
|
| 15
| Route 12 Queenstown Road — Auckland City Centre
| Northbound exit and southbound entrance
|-
| rowspan=2| Onehunga
|
| 13
| Neilson Street — Onehunga Wharf, Onehunga, Penrose, Mt Wellington
|
|-
|
| rowspan=2 colspan=3| Māngere Bridge over Manukau Harbour
|-
| rowspan=2| Māngere Bridge
|-
|
| 12
| Mahunga Drive — Māngere Bridge Township, Favona
| Southbound exit and northbound entrance
|-
| rowspan=4| Māngere
| 
| rowspan=2| 10
| Walmsley Road
| Southbound
|-
|
| Coronation Road
| Northbound
|-
|
| 9
|  SH 20A — Airport
| No southbound entrance (use SH20B or Massey Road)  Carriageway mainline connects north to west, traffic proceeding from/to south on motorway must 'exit'.
|-
|
| 7
| Route 14 Massey Road
| 
|-
| rowspan=2| Puhinui
|
| 3
|  SH 20B Puhinui Road — Airport
| No northbound exit (use Cavendish Drive)  Southbound entrance and connection to SH 20B and 
|-
| 
| 3
| Route 30 Cavendish Drive 
| No southbound exit (use Puhinui Road)  Northbound entrance and connection to SH 20B and 
|-
| rowspan=3| Manukau CBD
| 
| 2
| Lambie Drive — Manukau City Centre
|
|- 
|
| 1
|  SH 1 Southern Motorway north — Auckland
| rowspan=2| Western Ring Route ends
|-
|
|
|  SH 1 Southern Motorway south — Hamilton

References 

Transport in Auckland
Roads in New Zealand
2017 establishments in New Zealand